Lists of Apple software cover different types of software written by Apple Inc. or for Apple computers. They include:

Apple II

List of Apple II application software
List of Apple II games
List of Apple IIGS games

Mobile

List of iPod games
List of iOS games
List of free and open-source iOS applications

Macintosh

List of Macintosh games
List of Macintosh software
List of Macintosh software published by Microsoft